Megan Guarnier (born May 4, 1985) is an American former racing cyclist, who rode professionally between 2010 and 2019 for the ,  and  teams. She was made a member of Phi Beta Kappa at Middlebury College in 2007.

Major results

2009
 2nd Cholet Pays de Loire Dames
2011
 1st  Overall Giro della Toscana Int. Femminile – Memorial Michela Fanini
 9th Grand Prix Cycliste de Gatineau
2012
 1st  Road race, National Road Championships
 3rd Ronde van Gelderland
 4th Overall Trophée d'Or Féminin
 5th Overall Giro della Toscana Int. Femminile – Memorial Michela Fanini
 5th Le Samyn des Dames
 7th Overall Grand Prix Elsy Jacobs
 7th Omloop van Borsele
 7th La Flèche Wallonne Féminine
 10th Drentse 8 van Dwingeloo
2013
 2nd Omloop Het Nieuwsblad
 7th Overall Emakumeen Euskal Bira
 7th Omloop van Borsele
 9th Overall Holland Ladies Tour
 9th Drentse 8 van Dwingeloo
2014
 Pan American Road Championships
2nd  Road race
3rd  Time trial
 2nd Road race, National Road Championships
 3rd Open de Suède Vårgårda TTT
 5th Overall BeNe Ladies Tour
 6th Overall Emakumeen Euskal Bira
 7th Overall Giro d'Italia Femminile
 7th Cholet Pays de Loire Dames
 8th Tour of Flanders
 9th Overall Festival Luxembourgeois du cyclisme féminin Elsy Jacobs
 10th Overall Holland Ladies Tour
2015
 1st  Road race, National Road Championships
 1st  Overall Ladies Tour of Norway
1st Stage 1
 1st Strade Bianche
 2nd Overall Women's Tour of New Zealand
1st Stage 1 (TTT)
 3rd  Road race, UCI Road World Championships
 3rd Overall Giro d'Italia Femminile
1st  Points classification
1st Stage 2
 3rd La Flèche Wallonne Féminine
 4th Overall Emakumeen Euskal Bira
1st Stage 1
 6th Overall Holland Ladies Tour
 9th Le Samyn des Dames
 10th Tour of California Women's Time Trial
2016
 1st  Overall UCI Women's World Tour
 1st  Road race, National Road Championships
 1st  Overall Giro d'Italia Femminile
1st  Points classification
 1st  Overall Tour of California
1st  Points classification
1st Stage 1
 1st Durango-Durango Emakumeen Saria
 1st Philadelphia Cycling Classic
 2nd Overall Emakumeen Euskal Bira
1st Stage 4
 2nd Trofeo Alfredo Binda-Comune di Cittiglio
 2nd Pajot Hills Classic
 3rd La Flèche Wallonne Féminine
 4th Tour of Flanders
 5th GP de Plouay – Bretagne
 6th Strade Bianche
2017
 1st Stage 1 Tour of California
 2nd  Team time trial, UCI Road World Championships
 2nd Overall Ladies Tour of Norway
1st Stage 3
 4th Overall Giro d'Italia Femminile
1st Stages 1 (TTT) & 10
 4th La Course by Le Tour de France
 5th Overall Belgium Tour
 7th Overall Grand Prix Elsy Jacobs
2018
 1st  Overall Women's Tour de Yorkshire
1st  Mountains classification
1st Stage 2
 2nd Road race, National Road Championships
 3rd La Flèche Wallonne Féminine
 5th Overall Giro Rosa
 5th La Course by Le Tour de France
 8th Liège–Bastogne–Liège
 10th Tour of Flanders

General classification results timeline

One-day race results timeline

Major championship results timeline

References

External links

 
 
 
 
 
 
 
 

1985 births
Living people
American female cyclists
Sportspeople from Glens Falls, New York
Cyclists at the 2016 Summer Olympics
Olympic cyclists of the United States
Cyclists from New York (state)